The 1958 Pro Bowl was the NFL's eighth annual all-star game which featured the outstanding performers from the 1957 season. The game was played on January 12, 1958, at the Los Angeles Memorial Coliseum in Los Angeles, California in front of 66,634 fans. The West squad defeated the East by a score of 26–7.

The West team was led by the Detroit Lions' George Wilson while Buddy Parker of the Pittsburgh Steelers coached the East squad. San Francisco 49ers running back Hugh McElhenny was selected as the outstanding back of the game and defensive end Gene Brito of the Washington Redskins was named the outstanding lineman.

This was the first Pro Bowl to be televised nationally (except in the Los Angeles market where it was blacked out).

References

External links

Pro Bowl
Pro Bowl
Pro Bowl
Pro Bowl
1958 in Los Angeles
National Football League in Los Angeles
January 1958 sports events in the United States